Samuel Winston (6 August 1978 – 27 February 2023) was an English footballer who played as a forward.

Career
After helping Tottenham Hotspur reach the final of the FA Youth Cup, Winston signed for Norwich City to get more game time, but failed to make an appearance there.

In 1996, he signed for Leyton Orient in the fourth division, making 11 league appearances before joining fifth division side Yeovil Town.

In 2000, he signed for Kingstonian, another fifth division club, but left at the end of 2000–01 due to financial problems and relegation to the sixth division.

Death
Winston died on 27 February 2023, at the age of 44.

References

External links
 Sammy Winston at Archive.mehstg.com

1978 births
2023 deaths
English footballers
Footballers from Liverpool
Association football forwards
Leyton Orient F.C. players
Yeovil Town F.C. players
Sutton United F.C. players
Kingstonian F.C. players